, also written as 2011 SL25, is an asteroid and Mars trojan candidate that shares the orbit of the planet Mars at its  point.

Discovery, orbit and physical properties
 was discovered on 21 September 2011 at the Alianza S4 Observatory  on Cerro Burek in Argentina and classified as Mars-crosser by the Minor Planet Center. It follows a relatively eccentric orbit (0.11) with a semi-major axis of 1.52 AU. This object has noticeable orbital inclination (21.5°). Its orbit was initially poorly constrained, with only 76 observations over 42 days, but was recovered in January 2014.  has an absolute magnitude of 19.5 which gives a characteristic diameter of 575 m.

Mars trojan and orbital evolution
Recent calculations indicate that it is a stable  Mars Trojan with a libration
period of 1400 yr and an amplitude of 18°. values as well as its short-term orbital evolution are similar to those of 5261 Eureka.

Origin
Long-term numerical integrations show that its orbit is stable on Gyr time-scales (1 Gyr = 1 billion years). It appears to be stable at least for 4.5 Gyr but its current orbit indicates that it has not been a dynamical companion to Mars for the entire history of the Solar System.

See also 
 5261 Eureka (1990 MB)

References 

Further reading
Three new stable L5 Mars Trojans de la Fuente Marcos, C., de la Fuente Marcos, R. 2013, Monthly Notices of the Royal Astronomical Society: Letters, Vol. 432, Issue 1, pp. 31–35.
Orbital clustering of Martian Trojans: An asteroid family in the inner solar system? Christou, A. A. 2013, Icarus, Vol. 224, Issue 1, pp. 144–153.

External links 
  data at MPC.
 
 
 

Mars trojans

Minor planet object articles (unnumbered)
20110921